Reshma Shetty (born 2 November 1977) is a British-born American actress who is best known for her role as Divya Katdare on the USA Network TV series Royal Pains.

Early life
Shetty was born on 2 November 1977 to Hindu Indian parents in Manchester and moved to Richmond, Virginia at the age of 15. She originally studied pre-med at James Madison University, but success in vocal competitions prompted her to switch majors and graduate with a BM in opera performance. Shetty received her Master of Music in performance from the University of Kentucky before moving on to the Cincinnati Conservatory of Music, where she earned her artist diploma in opera in 2005.

Career
Shetty was cast as Priya, the female lead in the national tour of the Broadway musical Bombay Dreams in 2006. She also acted in the Off-Broadway play Rafta Rafta. She was a cast member on the American TV program Royal Pains portraying physician assistant Divya Katdare.

Shetty was also an occasional guest-panelist on the Fox News Channel satire show Red Eye w/Greg Gutfeld.
She starred as Queen Angella in the Netflix reboot She-Ra and the Princesses of Power. 
She is also the face of Dove moisturizer bar in India.

Personal life
Shetty currently resides in New York City, where they shot parts of Royal Pains. She is married to actor and financer Deep Katdare, who starred with her in Bombay Dreams. They married on March 19, 2011. She gave birth to their daughter Ariya Eliana on October 6, 2015.

Filmography

References

External links
 
 Interview at WickedInfo.com
 "Desis on Cable: Reshma Shetty and Danny Pudi": Interview in India Currents magazine by Ranjit Souri, November 2009

1977 births
Living people
Actresses from Kentucky
Actresses from Manchester
American actresses of Indian descent
American stage actresses
British actresses of Indian descent
British emigrants to the United States
British stage actresses
James Madison University alumni
University of Cincinnati alumni
University of Kentucky alumni
21st-century American women